Asemanabad (also Romanized as Āsemānābād) is a city in the Central District of Chardavol County, Ilam Province, Iran.

The city is populated by Kurds.

References

Populated places in Chardavol County
Cities in Ilam Province
Kurdish settlements in Ilam Province